Engoniophos unicinctus is a species of sea snail, a marine gastropod mollusk in the family Nassariidae.

Description
The length of the shell attains 27.1 mm.

Distribution
This marine species occurs off Guadeloupe.

References

  Petit de la Saussaye, S., 1852. Description de coquilles nouvelles. Journal de Conchyliologie 3: 51-59
 Fischer-Piette, E., 1950. Listes des types décrits dans le Journal de Conchyliologie et conservés dans la collection de ce journal. Journal de Conchyliologie 90: 8-23

External links
  Rosenberg, G.; Moretzsohn, F.; García, E. F. (2009). Gastropoda (Mollusca) of the Gulf of Mexico, Pp. 579–699 in: Felder, D.L. and D.K. Camp (eds.), Gulf of Mexico–Origins, Waters, and Biota. Texas A&M Press, College Station, Texas

Nassariidae
Gastropods described in 1826